A partial lunar eclipse took place on Thursday, May 24, 1956. It was the first eclipse of the last partial set in Saros series 120.

Visibility

Related lunar eclipses

Lunar year series

Tritos series

Half-Saros cycle
A lunar eclipse will be preceded and followed by solar eclipses by 9 years and 5.5 days (a half saros). This lunar eclipse is related to two total solar eclipses of Solar Saros 127.

Tzolkinex 
 Preceded: Lunar eclipse of April 13, 1949
 Followed: Lunar eclipse of July 6, 1963

See also
List of lunar eclipses
List of 20th-century lunar eclipses

Notes

External links

1956-05
1956 in science
May 1956 events